Phillip Gariseb (born 6 September 1973) is a Namibian footballer. He played in 18 matches for the Namibia national football team from 1995 to 1999. He was also named in Namibia's squad for the 1998 African Cup of Nations tournament.

References

External links
 

1973 births
Living people
Namibian men's footballers
Namibia international footballers
1998 African Cup of Nations players
Place of birth missing (living people)
Association footballers not categorized by position